Elizabeth Seymour may refer to:
Elizabeth Seymour, Lady Cromwell (c. 1518–1568), sister of Queen Jane, the third wife of Henry VIII of England
Elizabeth Seymour, Duchess of Somerset  (1667–1722), Whig politician
Elizabeth Percy, Duchess of Northumberland (1716–1776), née Seymour